Evon Clarke (born 2 March 1965) is a retired Jamaican sprinter. He represented his country at one indoor and one outdoor World Championships.

International competitions

References

1965 births
Living people
Jamaican male sprinters
Universiade medalists in athletics (track and field)
Place of birth missing (living people)
Central American and Caribbean Games gold medalists for Jamaica
Competitors at the 1990 Central American and Caribbean Games
Universiade silver medalists for Jamaica
Central American and Caribbean Games medalists in athletics
Medalists at the 1991 Summer Universiade
Medalists at the 1993 Summer Universiade
20th-century Jamaican people
21st-century Jamaican people